The 2022–23 SV Elversberg season will be the club's first season back in the 3. Liga since 2013–14.

In addition to the 3. Liga, SV Elversberg will also compete in the DFB-Pokal and the Saarland Cup.

Transfers

Squad

Competitions

Friendlies

3. Liga

Table

Matches

DFB-Pokal

Saarland Cup

References 

SV Elversberg
Football in Germany